The Melbourne Causeway is located entirely within Brevard County, Florida in the United States. It is composed of three bridges and connects the municipalities of Melbourne and Indialantic across the Indian River Lagoon in Brevard County. East of the bridge, the road is known locally as Fifth Avenue. On the western side, the road continues through downtown Melbourne as Strawbridge Avenue. Each July 4 the bridge is closed for a fireworks show.

There are two bridges in Melbourne, the Melbourne Causeway and the Eau Gallie Causeway (SR 518) With the latter being named for the old city of Eau Gallie, which merged with Melbourne in 1969.

History

First bridge
Ernest Kouwen-Hoven began construction of the second bridge across the Indian River in 1919. The first bridge was completed 2 years earlier near Cocoa, Florida. By May 1921 the bridge was complete and unofficially opened as a toll bridge. Approximately 1/3 of the way from Melbourne there was a  hand-operated draw. On September 18, 1921, the bridge officially opened. A Mr. J. E. Campbell was the first to drive across the bridge. During construction three sawmills were built by Ernest Kouwen-Hoven. They did not all exist at the same time.

Second bridge
The causeway between Indialantic and Melbourne was opened to traffic on August 1, 1939. The causeway consisted of fill material dredged from the bottom of the Indian River south of the causeway's location. The road surface was asphalt laid down and pressed by road rolling machines. The wooden bridge was largely replaced by the new causeway. The original bridge had a rotating span near the western end of the causeway to permit boat traffic to pass through and was operated by a person in a small shelter directly on the rotating section. In the following paragraph it appears that the author is referring to the replacement of the rotating draw span.

In 1941, construction began on the second bridge between Melbourne and Indialantic. This bridge was a low-rise swing draw bridge. On August 1, 1947, Mrs. Ernest Kouwen-Hoven cut the ribbon and the same J. E. Campbell that crossed the first bridge, was the first to cross this bridge.

Third bridge
According to the Melbourne Centennial Book the official start of construction was February 2, 1976, and the bridge was expected to be complete by fall of 1977. It appears to have been delayed with the westbound span being constructed in 1977 and ending 2 years later. From bridge id numbers, it appears that the western relief bridges were also constructed during this time. Construction of the eastbound span did not begin until 1981 and finished in 1984.

Component bridges

Ernest Kouwen-Hoven Memorial Bridge
The Ernest Kouwen-Hoven Memorial Bridge is the official name of the high-rise span, officially dedicated by the State of Florida Legislature on 28 May 1978. This name is not used locally, and only appears in official government documents.

Relief bridges
These bridges are unremarkable, and have no appreciable change in grade. The easternmost relief bridge is commonly used by local fishermen.

Sources

Bridge ID's
Town of Indialantic Meeting Minutes September 14, 2005
Town of Indialantic Meeting Minutes April 19, 2005
Contract Bidding Information for main-span work

Bridge length
Florida Geographical Data Library
 Search under Transportation Networks, "Bridges" retrieve "RCI Bridges". Data retrieved by using modified shp2text program.

Original bridge length
Trip to Florida by Scott M. Kozel

Bridge history
Melbourne Beach Historical Trail
Town of Indialantic History Page
Brevard County Historical Commission - Indian River Journal Quarterly - Fall 2002
Melbourne Centennial Book. Melbourne Chamber of Commerce. 1980

Kiwanis Park at Geiger Point
At the base of the causeway on the western side is the Kiwanis Park at Geiger Point, a 7-acre community park managed by the Brevard County Parks & Recreation.

References

Buildings and structures in Melbourne, Florida
Bridges in Brevard County, Florida
Bridges completed in 1921
Bridges completed in 1941
Bridges completed in 1979
Bridges completed in 1984
Bridges over the Indian River (Florida)
Bridges of the United States Numbered Highway System
Causeways in Florida
Former toll bridges in Florida
U.S. Route 92
Indian River Lagoon
Road bridges in Florida
Swing bridges in the United States
Concrete bridges in the United States